Helen Lilian Shaw (20 February 1913 – 13 June 1985) was a New Zealand short-story writer, poet and editor. She was born in Timaru, New Zealand, in 1913.

Shaw met Czech-New Zealand photographer Frank Simon Hofmann in Christchurch in 1940. Together they moved to Auckland, where they wed on 24 December 1941.

References

1913 births
1985 deaths
New Zealand women poets
People from Timaru
20th-century New Zealand poets
20th-century New Zealand women writers